Guruji is a surname. Notable people with the surname include:

Balakrishna Guruji (1955), Indian actor
Mahadaji Pant Guruji, Indian accountant, Special Envoy of Peshwas, tutor and advisor of Peshwa Madhavrao I and Sawai Madhavrao

Hindustani-language surnames
Surnames of Hindustani origin